Boo hoo may refer to the sound of someone crying.

Boo hoo may also refer to:

 Boo Hoo, a 2002 album by musician Voltaire
 "Boo-Hoo", a 1937 hit song recorded by Guy Lombardo and His Royal Canadians
 Boo Hoo the Bear, the mascot of Queen's University, Kingston, Ontario, Canada
 Boohoo the Clown, a Machine Empire monster from the Power Rangers television series
 Boohoo.com, a UK online fashion retailer

See also
 Boo (disambiguation)
 Hoo (disambiguation)